Victor Thomas Lawrence (2 January 1928 – 1 April 1986) was an Australian rules footballer who played with North Melbourne in the Victorian Football League (VFL).

A key defender, Lawrence was used as both a centre half-back and fullback during his career. Lawrence was a North Melbourne player from Colts level and broke into the seniors for the first time in 1948. He was a regular member of the side from 1950 to 1955, playing 105 of a possible 109 games. In the 1950 VFL Grand Final, which North Melbourne lost to Essendon, Lawrence played as the 19th man. He represented the VFL at interstate football in 1952 and was captain of North Melbourne in 1955, his final season.

In 1956 he was cleared to Tongala, a club in the Goulburn Valley Football League, and he later played for and coached Yallourn.

Following his death in 1986, the following tribute appeared in the Latrobe Valley Express newspaper:

References

1928 births
Australian rules footballers from Melbourne
North Melbourne Football Club players
Tongala Football Club players
1986 deaths
People from North Melbourne